Ethmia monachella is a moth in the family Depressariidae. It is in Colorado and Oklahoma in the United States.

The ground color of the forewings is pale slate gray with a broad, black, evenly and distinctly margined band from the base to the apex. The ground color of the hindwings is blackish.

References

Moths described in 1910
monachella